Gesneria calycosa is a species of plant in the family Gesneriaceae. It is endemic to Jamaica.

References

calycosa
Near threatened plants
Endemic flora of Jamaica
Taxonomy articles created by Polbot